Charbhuja is a famous temple of the lord  Krishna in the Garhbor village in the Kumbhalgarh tehsil of Rajsamand district in the state of Rajasthan, India. Charbhuja is another name of the Lord Krishna due to his four hands, ishtdevta of Mertiya Rathore. The motto of Mertiya's is Jai Charbhuja Ki.

History

Charbhuja is a historical and ancient Hindu temple located in Garhbor village of Kumbhalgarh tehsil of Rajsamand district in the state of Rajasthan, India. 

According to the legend, Lord Krishna expressed his desire to go to Gaulok himself, while ordering Uddhav to do penance in the Himalayas, and Uddhav said that I will be saved, but your pious devotees Pandavas and Sudama will hear the news of your going to Gaulok. Will give up their life. In such a situation, Shri Krishna asked Vishwakarma to make two idols of him and Balarama, which he gave to King Indra and told to hand over to Pandavas and Sudama and tell them that both these idols are mine and I am in them. Keep worshiping these idols with love, by doing my darshan and worship in the Kali Yuga, I will fulfill the desire of human beings. Indra Dev provided the idol of Shri Krishna to Sudama and the Pandavas. Sudama started worshiping these idols. Presently in Garhbor, the idol named Charbhuja ji is worshiped by Pandavas and the idol worshiped by Sudama is located in Sevantri village under the name of Rupnarayan ji. The Pandavas are said to have submerged the idol before going to the Himalayas so that no one can ruin its sanctity.

Then-Rajput ruler of Garhbor, Gangdev, was commanded by Charbhujanath ji to bring the idol out of river and install it in a temple. The king did so, he got the idol obtained from water installed in the temple. Over the years, 125 battles have been fought to safeguard this idol, and it has been immersed in water several times for protection. 

It is folktale that due to safeguard the idol from Muslims it was submerged in water again and with time it was forgotten but was again found by Suraji gujjar. The temple was built by ruler of Mewar and priest are from Gujjar community until today. The temple was built in 1444 AD. According to the inscription inside the temple, village name was Badri, therefore, the temple is also called Badrinath.

About the temple
The temple features a high shikhar, with the highest shikhar on the sanctum sanctorum, Charbhuja Nath Ji's shrine. The Shikhar features an octagonal spherical tomb-like shape in the centre. There are two other round shikhars nearby. The old temple has beautiful mirror work. The inner temple's shutters are gold, while the outside temple's shutters are silver. A Garud ji status is put in the other courtyard. Almost all of the other two shrines. On either side of the entrance is a stone elephant. The wide spaces surround the temple.

The idol of Shri Charbhuja Ji is 85 cm high. The four arms of the idol hold conch, discus, mace and a lotus flowers. The discus and the mace symbolize dynamic power, energy and prowess. Rajputs and Gujjars hold a special reverence for this temple. A sword and shield are displayed as symbols of Rajaput gallantry throughout every darshan (viewing time).

The temple is made by mirrors, Lime mortars and Marble. The excellent work of the mirror is done in the original temple. The shutters of the inner temple are made of gold while outer shutters are made of silver. Both outer and inner door of the temple are covered with silver. The temple received huge donation from the states of Mewar and Marwar and many articles of gold and silver are common in daily poojas. The Maharana of the Mewar has a special custom of visiting the temple round a year and offering prayers for the state for its well-being. Garud ji is installed in the other courtyard. Stone elephants are placed on the both sides of the entrance. The temple is in the open space. The temple is visited by lakhs of pilgrims.

10 km away from Gadhbor, there is another temple of Vishnu named "Roop Narayan" or "Roopji" located in the village Sevantri. Seventri and Gadhbor is connected by motorable road.

Fair on Jhaljhoolni Gyaras

A large fair is held in the village on Jal jhoolni Gyaras every year. Lakhs of devotees come here for worship of lord Charbhuja and get blessings from all over the India.

Jhaljhoolni Gyaras (Ekadashi) is the eleventh day of the bright fortnight of the Bhadrapad month (August/September). This day is specially celebrated in the Charbhuja. Pilgrims come by walking and other means for this day to the village and they get together and take the Lord to the lake nearby for the religious bath with a grand procession. After that they also perform special pooja of the lord. This great procession have many people and used to be welcomed with perfume and flowers.

The festivals of colours, Holi is also celebrated here on a big scale. This festival is celebrated for 15 days from the day of Holi.

Other festivals are Navratris, Janmashtami and Ramanavami.

Distance
It is 112 km from Udaipur and 32 km from Kumbhalgarh.

References

Hindu temples in Rajasthan
1444 establishments in Asia
15th-century establishments in India
Vishnu temples
Mewar
Villages in Rajsamand district
Tourist attractions in Rajsamand district